Sepfüzou Ward is a ward located under Nagaland's capital city, Kohima. The ward falls under the designated Ward No. 2 of the Kohima Municipal Council.

Education
Educational Institutions in Sepfüzou Ward:

Colleges 
 Alder College

Schools 
 Sepfüzou Government Primary School

See also
 Municipal Wards of Kohima

References

External links
 Map of Kohima Ward No. 2

Kohima
Wards of Kohima